Songs of Mass Destruction is the fourth solo studio album by Scottish singer Annie Lennox, released on 1 October 2007 by RCA Records and 19 Recordings. It was her first album of new material since 2003's Bare and to date her most recent of original material.

Singles
The first single, "Dark Road", originally appeared on Lennox's Myspace page on 15 August 2007. It was subsequently released as a single on 24 September 2007 and charted at number 58 on the UK Singles Chart.

The second single, "Sing", was released digitally on 1 December 2007 and it had a physical release as a single on 17 March 2008. "Sing" is a collaboration between Lennox and 23 other prominent female acts and artists and is a charity record aimed to raise money and awareness for the HIV/AIDS organization Treatment Action Campaign. The line-up consists of Madonna (who sings solo on the second verse of the song), Anastacia, Isobel Campbell, Dido, Celine Dion, Melissa Etheridge, Fergie, Beth Gibbons, Faith Hill, Angélique Kidjo, Beverley Knight, Gladys Knight, k.d. lang, Sarah McLachlan, Beth Orton, Pink, Bonnie Raitt, Shakira, Shingai Shoniwa, Joss Stone, Sugababes, KT Tunstall, and Martha Wainwright.

As Lennox reported herself on her official website, this song is about raising money and awareness for what she considers to be the HIV/AIDS genocide:

Critical reception
Songs of Mass Destruction received generally favourable reviews from critics upon its release, holding a Metacritic's average score of 68 out of 100 based on 18 reviews.

Tour
On 13 September 2007, Lennox announced a primarily North American tour for Songs of Mass Destruction called Annie Lennox Sings, which is the third solo tour of her career. Lasting throughout October and November 2007, the tour included 18 stops: London, San Diego, San Francisco, Los Angeles, Dallas, Boulder, Minneapolis, Chicago, Detroit, Toronto, Washington, D.C., Nashville, Atlanta, Miami, New York City (two dates), Philadelphia, and Boston. The venues generally were at medium-size theatres, except in New York City, where one of the dates was a United Nations fundraiser at Wall Street restaurant Cipriani.

Commercial performance
Songs of Mass Destruction debuted at number seven on the UK Albums Chart with 25,000 copies sold in its first week, and has since been certified Silver by the British Phonographic Industry (BPI). It peaked at number nine on the US Billboard 200, selling 78,000 copies its first week. As of October 2010, the album had sold 275,000 copies in the United States and 71,000 copies in the United Kingdom.

Track listing

Personnel
Credits adapted from the liner notes of Songs of Mass Destruction.

Musicians
 Annie Lennox – all vocals, piano, keyboards
 Blair Sinta – drums
 Sean Hurley – bass
 Joel Shearer – guitar
 Randy Kerber – piano, keyboards
 Zac Rae – keyboards
 Glen Ballard – keyboards
 Mike Stevens – keyboards, arrangements
 Eddie Baytos – accordion
 Nadirah X – rap on "Womankind"
 Anastacia, Angélique Kidjo, Beth Gibbons, Beth Orton, Beverley Knight, Bonnie Raitt, Celine Dion, Dido, Faith Hill, Fergie, Gladys Knight, Isobel Campbell, Joss Stone, k.d. lang, KT Tunstall, Madonna, Martha Wainwright, Melissa Etheridge, Pink, Sarah McLachlan, Shakira, Shingai Shoniwa, Sugababes – choir on "Sing"
 The Generics – additional performance on "Sing"

Technical
 Glen Ballard – production
 Tom Lord-Alge – mixing at South Beach Studios (Miami Beach, Florida)
 Femio Hernandez – mix assistance
 Scott Campbell – recording engineering
 Mike Stevens – additional production
 Ted Jensen – mastering at Sterling Sound (New York City)

Artwork
 Mike Owen – photography
 Allan Martin – design

Charts

Certifications

References

2007 albums
19 Recordings albums
Albums produced by Glen Ballard
Albums recorded at Westlake Recording Studios
Annie Lennox albums
Blues rock albums by Scottish artists
Funk rock albums by Scottish artists
RCA Records albums